The Going Away Present is the third and final studio album by Lowercase, released on May 4, 1999 through Punk In My Vitamins.

Track listing

Personnel
Imaad Wasif - vocals, guitar
Brian Girgus - drums
Tiber Scheer - bass
Tim Green - production, recording, guitar, keyboards
Pat Whalen - artwork
Andee Connors - layout
Jill Wooster - layout

Release history

References

External links
 

1999 albums
Lowercase (band) albums